Herrania balaensis is a species of flowering plant in the family Malvaceae. It is found only in Ecuador. Its natural habitat is subtropical or tropical moist lowland forests; it is fragmented due to colonization, mining, and deforestation.

References

Endemic flora of Ecuador
balaensis
Endangered plants
Taxonomy articles created by Polbot